Orveh may refer to:
 Orveh-ye Olya
 Orveh-ye Sofla
 Orveh-ye Vosta